Danilo Hondo (born 4 January 1974) is a German former professional road bicycle racer. He won the German National Road Race in 2002. He competed in the men's team pursuit at the 1996 Summer Olympics.

He was banned from professional cycling and then later won his appeal to return to the sport. From January 2015 to May 2019, Hondo worked as a coach for the Swiss cycling federation, first for the under-23 squad and then with the elite. He owns a bike shop on the island of Majorca.

Hondo was born in Guben, Brandenburg.

Doping
In 2005 Hondo was suspended and fired after testing positive for carphedon at the 2005 Vuelta a Murcia. Originally suspended for two years, Hondo's suspension was cut to 1 year in June 2005. In January 2006, Hondo had his ban extended to 2 years when he lost his appeal to the Court of Arbitration for Sport. In March 2006, has won his appeal in civil court, which gave Hondo an early end to his suspension.

Following revelations about blood doping by Erfurt-based doctor Mark Schmidt, Hondo confessed to having been a client of his in an interview with German broadcaster ARD on 12 May 2019. He said that he had paid €30,000 to Schmidt for blood transfusions in 2011. Hondo was subsequently fired by the Swiss federation.

Major results

1994
 1st  Team pursuit, UCI Track World Championships
1996
 3rd  Team pursuit, UCI Track World Championships
1998
 1st Stage 4 Vuelta Ciclista de Chile
1999
 Course de la Paix
1st Stages 1, 4 & 5
 1st Stage 1 Regio-Tour
2000
 Course de la Paix
1st Stages 3 & 5
 1st Stage 1b Tour of Sweden
2001
 Giro d'Italia
1st Stages 2 & 3
Held  after Stages 3–11
 1st Tour de Berne
 1st Stage 1 Three Days of De Panne
 1st Stage 1 Danmark Rundt
 1st Stage 4 Ronde van Nederland
 1st  Points classification Paris–Nice
2002
 1st  Road race, National Road Championships
 1st Stage 2 Volta a Catalunya
 1st Stage 2 Rheinland-Pfalz Rundfahrt
 1st Stage 3 Hessen-Rundfahrt
2003
 Course de la Paix
1st Stages 1 & 2
 2nd Rund um Köln
2004
 1st Gran Premio Bruno Beghelli
 1st Stage 1 Tour du Poitou-Charentes
 1st Stage 5 Volta a Catalunya
 2nd Overall Three Days of De Panne
1st Stage 1
 2nd Rund um Köln
 2nd Rund um den Henninger Turm
 2nd Paris–Tours
 3rd Trofeo Manacor
 5th Overall Four Days of Dunkirk
1st Stage 5 (ITT)
 6th Overall Niedersachsen-Rundfahrt
1st Stages 1, 2, 4 & 5
2005
 2nd Milan–San Remo
 8th Overall Vuelta a Murcia
1st Stages 1 & 2
2006
 1st Omloop van de Vlaamse Scheldeboorden
 1st Neuseen Classics
 Course de la Paix
1st Stages 2 & 3
 Circuito Montañés
1st Stages 2 & 3
 1st Stage 2 Sachsen-Tour
 2nd Overall Oddset–Rundfahrt
 2nd Overall Circuit Franco-Belge
 3rd Overall Regio-Tour
1st Stage 1
 3rd Rund um den Henninger Turm
 3rd Tour de Rijke
 3rd Kampioenschap van Vlaanderen
 3rd Omloop van het Houtland
2008
 1st Stage 4 Tour de Langkawi
2009
 1st Praha–Karlovy Vary–Praha
 1st Stage 7 Volta a Portugal
 2nd Coppa Bernocchi
 7th Overall Course de la Solidarité Olympique
1st Stage 5
2010
 9th Tour of Flanders
 1st Stage 4 Giro di Sardegna
 2nd Coppa Bernocchi
2011
 10th Rund um den Finanzplatz Eschborn-Frankfurt

Grand Tour general classification results timeline

See also
List of doping cases in cycling
List of sportspeople sanctioned for doping offences

References

External links

 

1974 births
Living people
Sportspeople from Guben
German male cyclists
German Giro d'Italia stage winners
Doping cases in cycling
Vuelta Ciclista de Chile stage winners
German cycling road race champions
UCI Track Cycling World Champions (men)
German track cyclists
Olympic cyclists of Germany
Cyclists at the 1996 Summer Olympics
People from Bezirk Frankfurt
Cyclists from Brandenburg
20th-century German people
21st-century German people